Julian Davies (born 16 March 1971) is a British judoka. He competed in the men's half-lightweight event at the 1996 Summer Olympics.

Achievements

References

External links
 

1971 births
Living people
British male judoka
Olympic judoka of Great Britain
Judoka at the 1996 Summer Olympics
Sportspeople from Salisbury